Madeiranzonia gibbera is a species of minute sea snail, a marine gastropod mollusk or micromollusk in the family Rissoidae.

References

External links
 Watson R. B. (1873). On some marine mollusca from Madeira, including a new genus of the Muricinae, a new Eulima and the whole of the Rissoa of the group of islands. Proceedings of the Zoological Society of London (1873): 361-391
 MNHN, Paris: syntype

Rissoidae
Gastropods described in 1873